The Last Hurrah may refer to:
 The Last Hurrah, a 1956 novel by Edwin O'Connor
 The Last Hurrah (1958 film)
 The Last Hurrah (1977 film)
 The Last Hurrah (2009 film)
 The Last Hurrah, a 2012 6-part audio play starring Rik Mayall
 "The Last Hurrah" (The West Wing)
 The Last Hurrah of the Golden Horde, first collection of science fiction stories by author Norman Spinrad
Last Hurrah for Chivalry, 1979 Hong Kong wuxia film directed and written by John Woo
Muhammad Ali vs. Larry Holmes, a boxing match billed as "The Last Hurrah"
"Last Hurrah" (song), a 2019 song by Bebe Rexha
 The Last Hurrah: Sterling Price's Missouri Expedition of 1864, a 2015 nonfiction book

See also
Huzzah
Hurrah (disambiguation)